Clifford Johnson (24 February 1914 – 22 July 1989) was an English footballer who played in the Football League for York City, Wolverhampton Wanderers, Port Vale and Torquay United.

Career
Born in Hessle, East Riding of Yorkshire, Johnson worked as a gardener before being invited to play for played for York City's Yorkshire League team, before being signed by the club as an amateur on 21 February 1935. He made his first team debut two days later, scoring two goals in a 7–3 victory over Crewe Alexandra in the Third Division North, becoming the first player to score two goals for York on their debut. His performance in this match resulted in Newcastle United and Middlesbrough asking about his availability, so York persuaded him to turn professional. He featured for York in four games before joining Wolverhampton Wanderers in March 1935, although he was unable to make a Football League appearance for the club.

He joined Port Vale in October 1935 and he made a "brilliant" debut in a 3–2 home win over Bradford Park Avenue on 2 November 1935, but was forced to undergo a cartilage operation after injuring his knee in the next match. He recovered by January 1936, but after making three FA Cup appearances in that month and three league appearances in April that year he was transferred to Torquay United in June 1936. He made eight league appearances and scored one goal for Torquay during the 1936–37 season. He died in Hessle on 22 July 1989, at the age of 75.

Career statistics
Source:

References

1914 births
1989 deaths
People from Hessle
Footballers from the East Riding of Yorkshire
English footballers
Association football forwards
York City F.C. players
Wolverhampton Wanderers F.C. players
Port Vale F.C. players
Torquay United F.C. players
English Football League players